Persikab Kabupaten Bandung or simply Persikab is an Indonesian football team based in Bandung Regency, West Java. They compete in the Liga 2. Their nickname is Dalem Bandung Warriors.

History
Persikab Bandung was established on 27 July 1963, although they have been around for a long time, they only got back into the national football competition when the regent of Bandung Regency at that time, H.U Hatta Djatipermana served as general chairman of Persikab Bandung, the best achievement achieved by Perikab Bandung was winning Liga Indonesia First Division in the 1995 season.

Persikab joined in 1995 Liga Indonesia First Division Central Group I along with Persitara Jakarta Utara, PSJS Jakarta Selatan, and PSGC Ciamis, their struggle in the Big 8 was held at the Klabat Stadium. Persikab joined in Group B with Persedikab Kediri, PSSB Bireuen, and Persma Manado. After a 1–1 draw with Persedikab, they are almost certain to qualify for the semifinals after a 4–1 win over PSSB. they managed to qualify for the semifinals after they drew 0–0 with Persma Manado, and they qualified for the final after a 2–0 win over PSBL Langsa. And finally they won the 1995 Liga Indonesia First Division after victory in the final round over Persma Manado 2–1 and was promoted to Liga Indonesia Premier Division.

On 11 November 1999, Persib Bandung had to lose to city rivals, Persikab Bandung in the 1999–2000 Liga Indonesia Premier Division. The match, entitled Derby Bandung which took place at the Siliwangi Stadium, which ended a 1–0 victory for Persikab. Persikab's single goal was scored by Heri Rafni Kotari in the 39th minute.

Stadium 
Persikab play their home matches at Si Jalak Harupat Stadium.

Coaching staff

Players

Current squad

Honours 
Liga Indonesia First Division
 Champion: 1994–95
Liga 3 West Java Series 1
Champion: 2021

References

External links 
 Persikab at Liga Iindonesia 
 

 
Football clubs in Indonesia
Football clubs in West Java
Association football clubs established in 1963
1963 establishments in Indonesia